The Sarhad University of Science and Information Technology (colloquially known as Sarhad University) is a private university in Peshawar, Khyber-Pakhtunkhwa, Pakistan. Established in 2001, it offers a wide range of programs from bachelor to doctoral level.

Current strength: 50000 students

Overview
Sarhad University is chartered by the Government of Khyber Pakhtunkhwa and recognized by the Higher Education Regulatory Authority (HERA) Khyber-Pakhtunkhwa. It is also recognized by the Higher Education Commission (Pakistan) (HEC) and awarded highest category (W3).

Academics
The university has of following faculties:

 Faculty of Engineering
 Faculty of Science
 Faculty of Management Science
 Faculty of Life Sciences
 Faculty of Social Science

UAE sub campus
Sarhad university established a sub campus in Ras al-Khaimah, UAE in 2017 which is approved by the HEC, Pakistan and licensed by the Government of Ras Al Khaimah, UAE.

See also
 List of universities in Peshawar
 List of universities in Pakistan

References

External links
 Official website

Computer science institutes in Pakistan
Educational institutions established in 2001
2001 establishments in Pakistan
Private universities and colleges in Khyber Pakhtunkhwa
Universities and colleges in Peshawar
Engineering universities and colleges in Pakistan